MEST or Mest may refer to:

As an initialism
 Ministry of Education, Science and Technology (disambiguation)
 Middle European Summer Time, obsolete variant name of the Central European Summer Time, a time offset
 MEST (Scientology) ("Matter, Energy, Space and Time"), used in Scientology to refer to the physical universe
 MEST (gene), a gene in humans that encodes the mesoderm-specific transcript homolog protein
 Meltwater Entrepreneurial School of Technology, a school in Accra, Ghana
 Cystic nephroma, a type of begin kidney tumor also known as a mixed epithelial stromal tumor

Other
 Mest, a pop punk band from Blue Island, Illinois
 Mest (album), their third studio album
 Revenge, the Russian word for which is Мест, rendered Mest in the Latin alphabet
 The Red Flute, a Soviet drama film with the Russian title Mest
 Soviet submarine M-200, a short-range attack submarine of the Soviet Navy
 Musti (Tunisia), a former Roman city in northern Tunisia, also known as Mest
 Vem vet mest? ("Who Knows Best?"), a Swedish game show

See also

 
 
 Moest (disambiguation)